At Home with Gary Sullivan is a weekly home improvement talk radio program hosted by Gary Sullivan. The program is distributed by Premiere Networks.

Availability
The program is syndicated to radio stations around the United States.
The program is also available as a podcast.

External links
Program website
Program page at Premiere Networks

American talk radio programs
Radio programs on XM Satellite Radio
Home improvement talk radio programs
2001 radio programme debuts